Bhujanga is a 2016 Indian Kannada romance film written by B. A. Madhu and directed by Jeeva. It was produced by Varuna Mahesh under his production company, Nagamale Movies. It stars Prajwal Devraj and Meghana Raj. The supporting cast features Sadhu Kokila, Bullet Prakash, Jai Jagadish, Tabla Nani, Santhosh and Padma Vasanthi. The film was released on 15 July 2016.

Cast  

Prajwal Devaraj as Bhujanga 
Meghana Raj as Rachana
Sadhu Kokila  
Bullet Prakash as Basya
Jai Jagadish 
Tabla Nani 
Santhosh 
Padma Vasanthi
Kalyani Raju
Chitra Shenoy 
Kuri Prathap
Mico Nagaraj 
Mico Shivu 
Aishwarya Shindogi in an item song

Production
The shooting of the movie commenced in May 2015 and finished in December 2015. It was shot in Bangalore, Mysore and some locations of Mangalore.

Soundtrack
The music of the movie has been composed by Poornachandra Tejaswi of Lucia fame. The movie has five songs

References

External links 
 

2016 films
2016 romance films
Indian romantic drama films
2010s Kannada-language films